Pudarci  (Serbian Cyrillic: Пударци) is a suburban settlement of Belgrade, the capital of Serbia. It is located in the Belgrade's municipality of Grocka.

Pudarci is located in the eastern part of the municipality, 41 km southeast of Belgrade and 7 km south of the municipal seat Grocka. It is on the crossroad of the Grocka-Umčari and Brestovik-Umčari roads, both of which connect the road of Smederevski put and the highway Belgrade-Niš. One branch of the road connects Pudarci with Kamendol, 2 km to the east.

Pudarci is classified as a rural settlement (village). It is a depopulating place, with the population of 1,643 in 1991 and 1,410 in 2002.

Suburbs of Belgrade
Šumadija